Doris violacea is a species of sea slug, a dorid nudibranch, a marine gastropod mollusc in the family Dorididae.

Distribution
This species was described from a depth of 30-40 fathoms on the east coast of the southern island of New Zealand at various locations between the Otago Peninsula and Sumaru.

References

Dorididae
Gastropods described in 1904